The Nauruan ambassador in Washington, D. C. is the official representative of the Government in the Yaren District to the Government of the United States.

In 1976 the governments of Hammer DeRoburt and Gerald Ford established diplomatic relations,
Nauru has no embassy in Washington, DC, but has a mission next the United Nations Headquarters in New York City.
In September 1999 the Republic of Nauru was admitted as the 187th member state of the United Nations, and subsequently established its Permanent Mission in January 2000. 
From Dec. 1999 to February 2005 Vinci Niel Clodumar was the first Permanent Representative of the Republic of Nauru next the Headquarters of the United Nations.

List of representatives

References 

 
Nauru
United States